Late December, released on April 24, 2007, is Maria McKee's sixth solo album. The album contains the single "A Good Heart", a song McKee had written over 20 years earlier but had never released. Feargal Sharkey had a U.K. No. 1 with the song in 1985.

Track listing
"Late December" (Jim Akin, Maria McKee)
"No Other Way To Love You" (Akin, McKee)
"A Good Heart" (McKee)
"Power On, Little Star" (McKee)
"Too Many Heroes" (McKee)
"Destine" (McKee)
"My First Night Without You" (McKee)
"Scene of the Affair" (McKee, Akin)
"Cat in the Wall" (McKee)
"One Eye On The Sky (One On The Grave)" (McKee, Akin)
"Bannow" (McKee)
"Starving Pretty" (McKee)

Personnel 
 Maria McKee - guitar, keyboards, piano, vocals
 Jerry Andrews - guitar
 Jim Akin - keyboards, guitar, bass, lap steel guitar
 Tom Dunne - drums, percussion

References

Maria McKee albums
2007 albums
Cooking Vinyl albums